In number theory, a Woodall number (Wn) is any natural number of the form

for some natural number n. The first few Woodall numbers are:

1, 7, 23, 63, 159, 383, 895, … .

History
Woodall numbers were first studied by Allan J. C. Cunningham and H. J. Woodall in 1917, inspired by James Cullen's earlier study of the similarly defined Cullen numbers.

Woodall primes

Woodall numbers that are also prime numbers are called Woodall primes; the first few exponents n for which the corresponding Woodall numbers Wn are prime are 2, 3, 6, 30, 75, 81, 115, 123, 249, 362, 384, ... ; the Woodall primes themselves begin with 7, 23, 383, 32212254719, ... .

In 1976 Christopher Hooley showed that almost all Cullen numbers are composite. In October 1995, Wilfred Keller published a paper discussing several new Cullen primes and the efforts made to factorise other Cullen and Woodall numbers. Included in that paper is a personal communication to Keller from Hiromi Suyama, asserting that Hooley's method can be reformulated to show that it works for any sequence of numbers , where a and b are integers, and in particular, that almost all Woodall numbers are composite. It is an open problem whether there are infinitely many Woodall primes. , the largest known Woodall prime is 17016602 × 217016602 − 1. It has 5,122,515 digits and was found by Diego Bertolotti in March 2018 in the distributed computing project PrimeGrid.

Restrictions
Starting with W4 = 63 and W5 = 159, every sixth Woodall number is divisible by 3; thus, in order for Wn to be prime, the index n cannot be congruent to 4 or 5 (modulo 6). Also, for a positive integer m, the Woodall number W2m may be prime only if 2m + m is prime. As of January 2019, the only known primes that are both Woodall primes and Mersenne primes are W2 = M3 = 7, and W512 = M521.

Divisibility properties
Like Cullen numbers, Woodall numbers have many divisibility properties. For example, if p is a prime number, then p divides

W(p + 1) / 2 if the Jacobi symbol  is +1 and

W(3p − 1) / 2 if the Jacobi symbol  is −1.

Generalization
A generalized Woodall number base b is defined to be a number of the form n × bn − 1, where n + 2 > b; if a prime can be written in this form, it is then called a generalized Woodall prime.

The smallest value of n such that n × bn − 1 is prime for b = 1, 2, 3, ... are
3, 2, 1, 1, 8, 1, 2, 1, 10, 2, 2, 1, 2, 1, 2, 167, 2, 1, 12, 1, 2, 2, 29028, 1, 2, 3, 10, 2, 26850, 1, 8, 1, 42, 2, 6, 2, 24, 1, 2, 3, 2, 1, 2, 1, 2, 2, 140, 1, 2, 2, 22, 2, 8, 1, 2064, 2, 468, 6, 2, 1, 362, 1, 2, 2, 6, 3, 26, 1, 2, 3, 20, 1, 2, 1, 28, 2, 38, 5, 3024, 1, 2, 81, 858, 1, 2, 3, 2, 8, 60, 1, 2, 2, 10, 5, 2, 7, 182, 1, 17782, 3, ... 

, the largest known generalized Woodall prime with base greater than 2 is 2740879 × 322740879 − 1.

See also
 Mersenne prime - Prime numbers of the form 2n − 1.

References

Further reading
 .
 .
 .

External links
 Chris Caldwell, The Prime Glossary: Woodall number, and The Top Twenty: Woodall, and The Top Twenty: Generalized Woodall, at The Prime Pages.
 
 Steven Harvey, List of Generalized Woodall primes.
 Paul Leyland, Generalized Cullen and Woodall Numbers

Integer sequences
Unsolved problems in number theory
Classes of prime numbers